Miriam Altman is a South African economist, business person, social activist, and strategist.

Education
Altman read economics at McGill University where she got a Bachelor's degree in 1984. She then proceeded to earn a M.Phil in economics from Cambridge and a Ph.D. in economics from Manchester University in 1989 and 1996 respectively.

Career
Altman served as an Executive Director at the Human Sciences Research Council where she worked on the "Employment Scenarios" project - its major project - from 2002 to 2012. The aim of the project was to utilise knowledge from stakeholders - the government, the private sector, labour and academia - in order to feasible solutions to reduce South Africa's high unemployment.

She was the Head of Strategy and Regulatory Affairs at Telkom from June 2013 and April 2016.

She currently works part-time as the Commissioner on the National Planning Commission in the Office of the Presidency - the parastatal tasked to guide long-term planning for South Africa - where she was recently since 2010. (She was reappointed for a second term in September 2015.)

In addition to the aforementioned roles, she is also a visiting professor at Tsinghua University, and a non-resident Fellow at the Centre for Emerging Markets at the China Europe International Business School (CEIBS) in Shanghai.

Dr. Altman is a prolific researcher with scores of academic publications and policy papers published.

Personal life
Outside her professional life, Altman is very involved in civil society  getting involved with community projects to ensure better public sector delivery. She is also involved in improving educational delivery and standards.

Her partner is Leslie Maasdorp, Vice President and CFO at the New Development Bank.

Select publications
300 publications posted on Miriam Altman's website at www.miriamaltman.com

Journal articles

References

External links
National Planning Commission profile

Miriam Altman on IDEAS/RePEc

Year of birth missing (living people)
Living people
20th-century South African economists
South African women economists
South African academics
South African women academics
McGill University alumni
Alumni of the University of Cambridge
Alumni of the University of Manchester
Academic staff of Tsinghua University
21st-century South African economists